Athelney Abbey, established in the county of Somerset, England, was founded by King Alfred in  888, as a religious house for monks of the Order of St. Benedict. It was dedicated to "Our Blessed Saviour, St. Peter, St. Paul, and St. Egelwine".

History

Origins
Originally Athelney was a small island in swampland, in what is now the parish of East Lyng, covered with alders and infested by wild animals. It was inaccessible except by boat, according to William of Malmesbury. Here Alfred the Great found a refuge from the Danes; here he built the abbey. The dedication to St. Æthelwine suggests that it may have been an enlargement of a hermitage or monastery already in existence. He peopled it with foreign monks, drawn chiefly from France, with John the Old Saxon (known as Scotus) as their abbot. The original church was a small structure, consisting of four piers supporting the main fabric and surrounded by four circular chancels. The original charter from Alfred still exists.

Norman era
From the 11th century up to the time of its dissolution the monks of Glastonbury Abbey attempted to annex it or have it placed under the Glastonbury jurisdiction. The abbey also appears in the Domesday book, and the Taxatio of 1291. In 1267, Henry III granted the abbey a weekly market on Mondays. However, it was not a rich community. An indulgence of thirty days was given in 1321 for those who should assist in the rebuilding of the church, and the monks humbly petitioned Edward I of England to remit corrody for which they were unable to find the means of payment. The last abbot was Robert Hamlyn. With eight monks of his community, he surrendered February 8, 1540, receiving a pension of £50 per annum and retaining his prebend of Long Sutton. The revenues (26 Hen. VII) were £209. 0s. 3/4 d. Both the 1267 charter of Henry III, and latter Henry VII also still exist.

Abbots
List of the known abbots include:

 John, the 'Old Saxon,' temp.
 Seignus, occurs 937 
 Alfric, occurs 1007
 Alfward
 Simon
 Athelward
 Athelwin, occurs 1020–5 
 Ralph Maledoctus, occurs 1125 
 Simon, occurs 1135 
 Benedict I, occurs 1159 
 Roger I, 1174–92 
 Benedict II, 1198–1227
 Roger II, elected 1227 
 Robert, elected 1245 occurs 1263 
 Osmund de Reigny 
 Richard de Derham, occurs 1267 
 Andrew de Sancto Fonte, 1280–1300 
 Osmund de Sowi, 1300–25 
 Robert de Ile, 1325 
 Richard de Gothurst or Cotehurst, 1341–9
 John Stoure, 23 September–22 October 1349
 Robert de Hache, elected 1349
 John Hewish, 1390 
 John Brygge, 1399
 John Petherton, 1424
 Robert Hylle(Hill), 1458  & 1462 
 Robert de Patient, 1481 
 John George, 1485 & 1498
 John Wellington, 1503 
 Richard Wraxall
 John Herte, 1518
 Thomas Sutton, 1527
 John Maior, 1531
 Robert Hamlyn or Hamblyn, 1533–9
 Robert Hamblyn, 1534
 Richard Wells 1539

Burials
Æthelwine of Athelney

Post dissolution
Following the dissolution it was acquired for use as a private residence by Lord Audley who had the church demolished. Audley's plans never eventuated and records show that on 17 August 1544 Audley sold the abbey to John Clayton, for £182 15s. and in April 1545 Clayton obtained a licence to sell it to John Tynbere. In 1674 further demolition work occurred by labourers of the then landowner, Captain John Hucker. In this work, excavations dug-up the bases of the pillars of the church and also revealed graves, one being 8-foot in length.

With the church demolished and other buildings fallen into disrepair, nothing visible remains at the site today.
Several geophysical surveys have been carried out to explore the remains which still exist below ground level. Today the site of the Abbey is marked by King Alfred's Monument which is a Grade II listed building, and Scheduled Ancient Monument. The monument was built in 1801 by Sir John Slade of Maunsel House, who owned Athelney farm.

References

Attribution
 The entry cites:
William Dugdale, Monasticon Anglicanum;
Asser, De Rebus Gestis Alfridi;
Hearne, Script. Hist. Angl. XXVIII (1731), 587-90.

Benedictine monasteries in England
Anglo-Saxon monastic houses
Monasteries in Somerset
9th-century establishments in England
1540 disestablishments in England
Scheduled monuments in Sedgemoor
Christian monasteries established in the 9th century
Religious buildings and structures completed in 888